State Road 865 (SR 865) and County Road 865 (CR 865) are a series of roads serving Lee County, Florida. Originally a continuous state road extending from Bonita Springs to Tice by way of Fort Myers Beach and Fort Myers, SR 865 now consists of two segments connected by a part of CR 865, which also extends to the north and south of the state segments.

Until the 1980s, State Road 865 signs were posted along a much longer highway.  In the mid 1970s, FDOT designated three large sections of then-SR 865 as secondary routes, which started a process in which these designated sections would be converted to county control.  This was part of a series of transformations that particularly affected Southwest Florida.

Route description

Bonita Springs and Fort Myers Beach

From there CR 865 follows Bonita Beach Road westward through Bonita Springs  to Hickory Boulevard on Bonita Beach (Little Hickory Island), near the Gulf of Mexico shore. Motorists traveling north then cross the Bonita Beach Causeway, which passes over Big Hickory Island, Long Key and Black Key, which provides access to the Lovers Key / Carl E. Johnson State Park. Once on Estero Island,  CR 865 passes through the town of Fort Myers Beach before connecting to San Carlos Boulevard on the north end of the island. State maintenance begins the intersection of Estero and San Carlos boulevards just east of Bodwitch Point Park. After crossing the Matanzas Pass Bridge and San Carlos Island onto the mainland, SR 865 forms the western boundary of Estero Bay Preserve State Park adjacent to Hurricane Bay.

Iona and South Fort Myers 
San Carlos Boulevard then intersects with Summerlin Road (CR 869), which is a grade-separated single-point urban interchange, with Summerlin Road crossing above on an overpass. This interchange also provides access to Sanibel Island. The southern section of SR 865 continues northward its northern terminus, an intersection with McGregor Boulevard, which is SR 867 to the northeast of the intersection, and CR 867 to the southwest, a more direct route connecting downtown Fort Myers to the popular Sanibel and Captiva islands.

At this point, SR 865 ends and CR 865 resumes, proceeding east along Gladiolus Drive. East of here, CR 865 intersects Summerlin Road (CR 869) again, this time at an at-grade intersection with two left-turning flyover ramps. It passes by Lakes Park before intersecting with U.S. Route 41 (US 41), where the route transitions yet again to SR 865.

Extending only  in South Fort Myers, the northern section of SR 865 is locally known as the Ben C. Pratt Six Mile Cypress Parkway.  It begins at Tamiami Trail (US 41) and terminates at an intersection with Metro and Michael G. Rippe Parkways (SR 739).  This portion of the parkway historically served as the first mile of the Seaboard Air Line Railroad's Punta Rassa Branch.  Though this section runs in east–west route, it is still signed as a north–south route to be consistent with the adjacent county-controlled segments.

East Fort Myers and Tice 
Beyond the northern section's terminus at SR 739, historic SR 865 continues along Six Mile Cypress Parkway and turns north passing the Lee County Sports Complex, which contains Hammond Stadium, the spring training home of the Minnesota Twins major league baseball team.  As it turns north, it parallels the Six Mile Cypress Slough.  At Colonial Boulevard (SR 884), historic SR 865 becomes Ortiz Avenue and parallels Interstate 75 to its northern terminus, an intersection with Palm Beach Boulevard (SR 80) in Tice.  Parts of Ortiz Avenue were originally signed State Road 80B before being connected to the rest of SR 865.

History
The entire route of SR 865 came into existence incrementally over the span of many decades.  Gladiolus Drive originally existed to serve gladiolus fields in Iona and Biggar.  Lee County was once known as the gladiolus capital of the world, with the A&W Bulb Company being one of the major operators of the fields.

San Carlos Boulevard was built in 1927 to serve as a more direct route from McGregor Boulevard (SR 867) to Fort Myers Beach, replacing an earlier route that traversed present-day Bunche Beach.  Estero Boulevard, San Carlos Boulevard and Gladiolus Drive were first designated State Road 278 in 1935.  State Road 278 would become State Road 865 during the 1945 Florida State Road renumbering.  The northernmost  of San Carlos Boulevard (in Iona) was renumbered SR 867 when McGregor Boulevard was realigned slightly south  in the early 1980s (Old McGregor Boulevard is the former alignment).  Gladiolus Drive would also be realigned to the south in the early 1990s (Paul Schultz Way is the former alignment of Gladiolus Drive).

Estero Boulevard reached the southern tip of Fort Myers Beach by 1950.  Upon the completion of the Bonita Beach Causeway in 1965, the SR 865 designation was extended south from Fort Myers Beach through Bonita Springs along Hickory Boulevard and Bonita Beach Road.  Bonita Beach Road was developed in the 1950s as Bonita Springs main east–west thoroughfare.

The construction of Six Mile Cypress Parkway was the final link in the entire route, which opened around 1978 to provide improved access from the area to Interstate 75 (which opened in 1979).  With the completion of Six Mile Cypress, Gladiolus Drive was realigned to the north at the intersection with US 41.  The SR 865 designation then continued along Six Mile Cypress, which ran east along a former railroad spur, then turned north along the Six Mile Cypress Slough to connect with Ortiz Avenue (which existed previously as State Road 80B).

The entire route from Bonita Springs to Tice would only be designated SR 865 for a short time before the state relinquished portions to the county.

Major intersections

References

External links

865
865
Transportation in Fort Myers, Florida
865